Saindak, is a town in Chagai, Balochistan, Pakistan. Large deposits of copper and gold have been discovered in Saindak. The Saindak Copper Gold Project has caused economic prosperity in the town. Saindak is the regional headquarters of the Pakistan Frontier Corps.

External links

 Saindak Copper-Gold Project

Populated places in Chagai District